Kaštilac was a fortress of a Benedictine Monastery located by the Adriatic Sea in central Dalmatia, and is now a settlement in Kaštel Gomilica, located in the central part of Split-Dalmatia county, Croatia. Kaštilac is the only castle of seven castles in Kaštela.

History
King Zvonimir of Croatia of the Svetoslavić branch of the House of Trpimirović, had donated to a Benedictine from Split possession in the Kaštela field (Kaštelansko polje) in 1078. In the 12th century Benedictine built a church of St. Cosmas and Damian in the Romanesque Architecture style.

Due to the Turkish threat, Benedictine nuns completed the construction of a fortified settlement Kaštilac on the islet of Gomilica in 1545. Entrance to the castle is protected by high tower over the stone bridge with arches. Fortress has square floor plan and in the past, at the entrance was located drawbridge. After the fortress was completed, within the fortification walls arrived inhabitants of the Upper and Lower Kozica, after the Turks had devastated their former villages. In the 17th century the tower lost its defensive function.

See also
Kaštel Gomilica
Kaštela
Order of Saint Benedict

References

External links
 https://web.archive.org/web/20110222152116/http://www.kastela-info.hr/hr/kastel-gomilica-zanimljivosti

Buildings and structures in Split-Dalmatia County
History of Dalmatia
Castles in Croatia